is the second single by B'z, released on May 21, 1989.
The single did not chart on the Oricon Singles Chart and has since been played live very few times. It's the first song by the band to have a tie-in, being featured as the ending theme for the TBS TV drama Haimisu de Warukatta ne!

The song has since appeared on multiple compilations and an English version titled "I Wanna Dance Wicked Beat Style" was released on the EP Wicked Beat.

Track listing

References 

1989 singles
B'z songs
Songs written by Tak Matsumoto
Songs written by Koshi Inaba
1989 songs